Magen Lacholeh, Shield and Protector of the Sick, is a Jerusalem, Israel-based non-profit organization, created in 1991 to facilitate the link between patients and health professionals. It provides the knowledge, contacts, support and equipment that allow every patient to receive the right medical care.

The organization is headed by Rabbi Benjamin Fisher and operates six branches throughout Israel.

Background 
Magen Lacholeh was founded at the initiative of Rabbi Shlomo Zalman Auerbach, a renowned Rabbinical leader in the Jewish world. Rabbi Auerbach started the organization as he saw a need for guidance to those who seek medical attention. He envisioned an organization that helps patients find the best possible medical care by directing them to those health professionals who are the best suited to deal with their specific situation. Rabbi Shlomo Zalman personally opened Magen Lacholeh’s first bank account, bought Rabbi Fisher's first beeper, and continued to fund the organization until his death.

Magen Lacholeh's services are provided free of charge and without regard to religion. The organization is structured to provide emergency response in life-threatening situations and operates day and night.

Services 
 Medical Referral Hotline
 Emergency Hotline (24/7)
 Appointment Scheduling
 Counseling
 Ambulance Service
 Air ambulance and Surgery Abroad
 Medical Equipment
 Bureaucracy and Red Tape
 Advocacy

External links
Magen Lacholeh website

References 
 
 
 
 
 
 
 
 
 
 
 
 
 
 
 
 
 

Medical and health organizations based in Israel